Thodarum is a 1999 Indian Tamil-language drama film directed by Ramesh Khanna, starring Ajith Kumar, Devayani and Heera. The supporting cast of Manivannan, Vadivelu and Gemini Ganesan also play pivotal roles in the film. The film is the Tamil remake of 1996 Telugu film Maavichiguru, and was released on 14 January 1999.

Plot 
Seetha is a possessive wife who suspects that all the women are throwing themselves at her husband Jayaram. Things get a little interesting after Meera enters the picture and ends up hugging Jayaram right in front of Seetha's eyes. Seetha is diagnosed with a deadly heart condition and decides to have  and Meera tie the knot for the sake of a good life for her young son. She even goes as far as getting a divorce from Jayaram to make him hate her. In the end, Seetha dies, Jayaram and Meera get married, and they name their baby Seetha.

Cast 
Ajith Kumar as Jayaram
Devayani as Seetha
Heera as Meera
Gemini Ganesan as Seetha's grandfather
Sowcar Janaki as Seetha's grandmother
Manivannan
Vadivelu as "Peon" Mani
Vichithra as Radha
Delhi Ganesh as Seetha's uncle
Senthil

Production 
Actor Ramesh Khanna made his debut as a director with the film after working as an apprentice to K. S. Ravikumar. Ravikumar was meant to remake the Telugu film Maavichiguru (1996) starring Jagapati Babu and Aamani into Tamil for Sridevi Movie Makers, but his busy schedule meant that he recommended Ramesh Khanna to the producers. The remake was initially titled as Maa Vilakku and was supposed to star Jayaram and Meena, but went through cast changes. Jayaram's falling popularity meant that Ajith Kumar was signed to replace him, while the actor requested that a change of lead actress. The film was revived under new title Thodarum with new cast involving Ajith Kumar, Heera and Devayani.

Release 
The film released on 14 January 1999 and received poor reviews upon release, with a critic from Indolink.com citing that the "cinematography and direction provide no room for discussion" and that "Devayani appears painfully artificial". The New Indian Express also gave the film a critical review citing that "the director tries hard to avoid small puddles of cliches, but unfortunately falls into an ocean instead" but claims that Devayani gives a "wonderfully controlled performance", while Heera and Ajith are just "adequate". Deccan Herald wrote "Thodarum is a family melodrama, which on its own is not too bad, but [..] it falls completely flat."

Soundtrack 
Soundtrack is composed by Ilaiyaraaja. Lyrics for the songs were written by Pulamaipithan, Gangai Amaran, Mu. Metha, Kamakodiyan, Arivumathi and Palani Bharathi.

References

External links 

1999 films
Tamil remakes of Telugu films
Films scored by Ilaiyaraaja
1990s Tamil-language films
1999 directorial debut films